Royal Mail Group Ltd v Efobi [2021] UKSC 33 is a UK labour law case, concerning race discrimination and the burden of proof.

Facts
Mr Efobi, a postman for the Royal Mail from Nigeria, claimed race discrimination after he applied for 30 technical jobs to suit his computing qualification between 2011 and 2015. He said it was direct or indirect discrimination, harassment and victimisation.

The Tribunal dismissed the claims. The EAT allowed an appeal as EA 2010 section 136(2) was not, in its view, properly interpreted. The Court of Appeal reversed the EAT.

Judgment
Lord Leggatt held that Mr Efobi had no claim since the Race Relations Act 1976 like the [[Equality Act 2010 section 136 involved a two-stage test. First the claimant proved facts from which a Tribunal could conclude there was unlawful discrimination. If no such facts were proved, the claim failed. Second if facts were proven from which there could be a conclusion of discrimination, the burden shifted to the employer to explain the reasons, and that race was no part. Mr Efobi’s argument that there was no longer any burden on the claimant to prove anything was wrong. A Tribunal had to consider evidence from all sources, and ignore explanations by the employer for treatment complained of. The claimant must prove, on the balance of probabilities, those matters which he or she wishes the tribunal to find as facts from which (in the absence of any other explanation) an unlawful act of discrimination can be inferred. The Tribunal was not wrong to not draw adverse inferences (that Mr Efobi argued for) from the fact that none of the actual decision-makers gave evidence.

See also

UK labour law
Stefanko v Doherty and Maritime Hotel Ltd [2019] IRLR 322 (EAT)

Notes

References

United Kingdom labour case law